Orion Energy Systems Inc. is an American LED lighting and intelligent controls enterprise, founded in Plymouth, Wisconsin, and headquartered in Manitowoc, Wisconsin

History 

Orion Energy Systems Inc. was founded in 1996 and is headquartered in Manitowoc, Wisconsin. Its initial public offering (IPO) occurred on December 18, 2007.

In March 2009 President Barack Obama highlighted the company's lighting systems in a policy speech about new energy technology and "green collar" jobs. and on January 26, 2011, visited the company.

References

External links

Companies listed on the Nasdaq
Companies based in Wisconsin
Manitowoc County, Wisconsin
2007 initial public offerings